Wild Primrose is a 1918 American silent drama film directed by Frederick A. Thomson and starring Gladys Leslie, Richard Barthelmess, Eulalie Jensen, Charles Kent, and Claude Gillingwater. The film was released by V-L-S-E, Incorporated on August 12, 1918.

Plot

Cast
Gladys Leslie as Primrose Standish
Richard Barthelmess as Jack Wilton
Eulalie Jensen as Marie
Charles Kent as Williams
Claude Gillingwater as Standish
Ann Warrington as Emily
Arthur Lewis as Griff
Bigelow Cooper as Newton
Gladys Valerie

Preservation
The film is now considered lost.

References

External links

1918 drama films
Silent American drama films
1918 films
American silent feature films
American black-and-white films
Vitagraph Studios films
Lost American films
1918 lost films
Lost drama films
Films directed by Frederick A. Thomson
Films with screenplays by Joseph F. Poland
1910s American films